The Masterpiece is the fifth and as of 2022 the most recent  studio album by American singer Bobby Brown, released on June 5, 2012 on Bronx Bridge Entertainment. It is his first studio album in 15 years since Forever. It is also his first album to be issued the Parental Advisory label.

Track listing

Personnel
Credits for The Masterpiece adapted from AllMusic.

 Kenny Arnoff – drums
 Ron Avant – keyboards
 Orbel Babayan – guitar
 Ian Branch – mixing
 Bobby Brown – executive producer, vocals
 Christopher L. Brown – executive producer
 Paul Cabbin – creation
 Mabvuto Carpenter – vocals (background)
 Rod Castro – guitar
 April Dawson – cover design
 Keith Eaddy – bass
 Alicia Etheredge – executive producer
 Ben Franklin – producer

 Marshall Goodman – drums
 Jared Gosselin – programming
 Jared Lee Gosselin – producer, programming
 Bernie Grundman – mastering
 Matt Hennessey – mixing, producer
 Sean Horton – drums
 Jean Marie Hovat – mixing
 Mika Lett – backing vocals
 James LoMenzo – bass
 Lamar Mitchell – keyboards, synthesizer
 Terrill Paul – backing vocals
 Skip Saylor – additional production, mixing
 Mandy Strong – layout

Charts

References

External links

2012 albums
Bobby Brown albums